Caprino Veronese is a comune (municipality) in the Province of Verona in the Italian region Veneto, located about  west of Venice and about  northwest of Verona.

Caprino Veronese borders the following municipalities: Affi, Brentino Belluno, Costermano, Ferrara di Monte Baldo, Rivoli Veronese, and San Zeno di Montagna.

Demographic evolution

Twin towns
 Gau-Algesheim, Germany, since 1984
 Saulieu, France, since 2004

References

External links
 The original, formerly official website

Cities and towns in Veneto